Donald's Cousin Gus is a 1939 Walt Disney cartoon in which Donald Duck is visited by his gluttonous cousin, Gus Goose, who proceeds to eat Donald out of house and home. It was released on May 19, 1939. Gus Goose debuted as a recurring character in Al Taliaferro's Donald Duck newspaper comic since 9 May 1938.

This cartoon was also the first-ever pre-recorded program (in this case, film) to be televised in the United States, airing as part of NBC's "first night" of sponsored programming on May 3, 1939, exactly one week after the film was released in theaters.

The short was directed by Jack King, and animated by Lee Morehouse, Wolfgang Reitherman, and Don Towsley. The story was created by Jack Hannah and Carl Barks.

Voice cast
 Donald Duck: Clarence Nash
 Barking Hot Dog: Pinto Colvig
 Gus Goose: Jimmy MacDonald (sound effects)

Home media

VHS
In the United States on Cartoon Classics: Limited Gold Editions: Donald
In Germany on Donald Duck Geht in die Luft, Drei Caballeros im Sambafieber, Goofy und Pluto Total Verrückt, and Mit Mir Nicht
In France on Disney Parade 3
In Italy on Paperino, Sono Io ...  Paperino, Cartoons Disney 6

Laserdisc
Japanese laserdiscs: Hello Donald, Donald: Limited Gold Edition, and Disney Cartoon Festival 3.

DVD
The short was released on May 18, 2004, on Walt Disney Treasures: The Chronological Donald, Volume One: 1934-1941.

Television
It was later reaired on television on:
The Ink and Paint Club, episode 21, Goin' to the Birds
Mickey's Mouse Tracks, episode 77
Disneyland, episode The Plausible Impossible

References

External links

1930s color films
Donald Duck short films
1930s Disney animated short films
1939 films
1939 animated films
Films directed by Jack King
Films produced by Walt Disney
Films scored by Oliver Wallace
Films with screenplays by Carl Barks
1930s American films